In this List of Perkins engines, family type refers to the two letter designation Perkins Engines gives each engine. This nomenclature was introduced in 1978 under Perkins' new engine numbering scheme, where the family type is encoded in each unique serial number. Engines that went out of production prior to 1978 may have been retroactively assigned a family type to expedite parts support (this is the case with the Perkins 4.107). Some engines never entered production, such as the Perkins 4.224, but were assigned a family type. In the early years, Perkins gave names to their engines, beginning with the smallest Wolf. The larger Lynx and Leopard followed (all four-cylinders), with the 1937 P6 was intended to be called the "Panther." After a lawsuit from motorcycle manufacturer Phelon & Moore, Perkins dropped the Panther (and Python and Puma for the corresponding P3 and P4 models) and stuck to abbreviations from then on.

Perkins was sold by Massey Ferguson's parent Varity Corporation in 1998, and is now a fully owned subsidiary of Caterpillar Inc.

See also
Perkins Engines - Company article
Frank Perkins - Founder of the Company
Massey Ferguson - Former parent company of Perkins engines

References

 Perkins Diesel Conversions & Factory fitted units, by Allan T. Condie, 2nd edition 2000, 
The 4 107T was used in UK Military electricity generating sets, the engines when in need an overhaul were rebuilt by a Kent based engineering works in Ramsgate, adjacent to the inner Harbour known as Walkers Marine  (Marine Engineers) Ltd. Houchins of Ashford an MOD contractor would send an MOD inspector to verify dynamometer testing of power and smoke emissions both on start up and full power for one full hour (27 horsepower produced at 3000 rpm) being used near military front lines any excessive smoke whilst running would give the armies position away. When the transport vessel "Atlantic conveyor" was sunk during the Falklands conflict a large quantity of these generating units were lost. The engines were highly stressed due to turbo charging,  the 4-107T used a Holset Brand turbocharger without after-cooling, and the longer 4-108 pistons with extended skirts, also a toughened tufftrided crankshaft, larger diameter cylinder head studs were used to contain the high combustion pressures. The engines when rebuilt could take up to four days of diligent running on the "Heenan and Froud" water dynamometer with great care given regarding application and duration of the load as minor tightening was not un-common, and a heavy seizure could result in disassembly and liner and piston replacement. But once run in the process of gaining full power with minimal rpm overshoot or droop or heavy black smoke was achieved by finely adjusting the injection timing and governor load springs in the CAV DPA injection pump.

Ian V Curtis recollections whilst an apprentice Diesel Engineer at Walkers Marine during the 1980s.

External links

Perkins Engines Company
Perkins in Czech Republic
 History of Perkins Engines
Perkins Parts
Perkins.com
Webcitation.org

Engine technology
Perkins
Perkins engines